The table below details World Championship Grand Prix results for the Tyrrell Formula One team. The second table includes results from privately owned Tyrrell cars in World Championship Grands Prix.

Tyrrell Racing
(key)
Notes

Results of other Tyrrell cars

Formula One World Championship results for Tyrrell cars entered by other teams.
(key)

Non-championship results
<div style="overflow-x: auto; margin: 1em 0">
(key)

Notes

References

Formula One constructor results
Results